2 Seconds is a 1998 Canadian drama film. This film premiered in 1999 at the Sundance Film Festival. Written and directed by Manon Briand, 2 Seconds stars Charlotte Laurier as Laurie, a bisexual woman who takes a job as a bike courier in Montreal after being fired from her previous job as a professional downhill racer. 
Laurie is forcefully retired as a downhill racer when her concerns about her signs of aging cause her to lose her last race by 2 seconds (hence the name of the movie). Laurie and the one bike she was allowed to keep then move in with her geeky, physics-loving brother who is trying very hard to find a girlfriend. While putting her bike together, Laurie discovers that she is missing a gear on her bicyclette so she makes do with what she has. Because of this, she breaks the chain on her bike one day, leading to her meeting with her soon-to-be best friend Lorenzo. Lorenzo is an ex Italian professional racer who currently works as a bike mechanic in his own bike shop. offered her a job at the bicycle company, but one of her co workers, Willie, tries to make her life miserable. After talking to Lorenzo, Laurie figures out what she needs to do to help herself and try to resolve things.

Cast

Reception

Critical reception 

Brendan Kelly of Variety praised the film, saying "there is no shortage of nifty visual flourishes. . .Soundtrack is an appropriately cool urban mix of jazz and modern-rock sounds." The Melbourne International Film Festival called it "An understated film with an extraordinarily simple premise"

Awards

See also 
 List of LGBT films directed by women

References

External links 
 

1998 films
Canadian drama films
1990s French-language films
1998 drama films
Films set in Quebec
Films directed by Manon Briand
Canadian LGBT-related films
LGBT-related drama films
1998 LGBT-related films
Lesbian-related films
1990s Canadian films